Hydrotaea diabolus is a fly of the family Muscidae. Its larvae have been found in pig, cow and horse manure. It is found in the Palearctic .

References

External links
D'Assis Fonseca, E.C.M, 1968 Diptera Cyclorrhapha Calyptrata: Muscidae Handbooks for the Identification of British Insects pdf
Seguy, E. (1923) Diptères Anthomyides. Paris: Éditions Faune de France Faune n° 6 393 p., 813 fig.Bibliotheque Virtuelle Numerique  pdf

Muscidae
Muscomorph flies of Europe
Insects described in 1780
Taxa named by Moses Harris